Murgap District   is a district of Mary Province in Turkmenistan. The administrative center of the district is the town of Murgap.

Founded as Stalin District in February 1935, this district joined Mary four years later, in November 1939. Twenty-two years later, it was renamed to its current name, Murgap, as part of a de-Stalinization campaign. It was administered directly by the Turkmen SSR government after Mary dissolved in January 1963.

In December 1970, Murgap joined Mary again, where it stays until this day.

References

Districts of Turkmenistan
Mary Region